There are over 9,000 Grade I listed buildings in England. This page is a list of these buildings in the district of Cherwell in Oxfordshire.

List of buildings

|}

See also
 Grade I listed buildings in Oxfordshire
 Grade I listed buildings in Oxford
 Grade I listed buildings in South Oxfordshire
 Grade I listed buildings in Vale of White Horse
 Grade I listed buildings in West Oxfordshire
 Grade II* listed buildings in Cherwell (district)

Notes

References

External links

Cherwell
Lists of Grade I listed buildings in Oxfordshire
Listed